Ceratocrania macra is a mantis species in the family Hymenopodidae. The English common name is bark horned mantis.  No subspecies are listed.  It is found in Java, Borneo, and Sumatra.

References

Arthropods of Indonesia
Mantidae
Insects described in 1889